Alien Opponent is a 2010 American television science fiction film written by John Doolan, directed  by Colin Theys, and starring Roddy Piper. It was first broadcast on Chiller and later released on DVD by Shout! Factory.

Plot 
The abusive, drunk owner of a small-town junkyard is killed by his mother in law just before an alien crash-lands in the middle of it. In order to collect their insurance money, the family has to recover his body, so they offer a cash prize for recovery of the body and put out local ads. Soon, the junkyard is a warzone, as every local wingnut turns up with a weapon to fight the alien invader.

Cast 
 
Roddy Piper as Father Melluzzo 
Jeremy London as  Brooklyn Davis 
 Cuyle Carvin as Bradan James
 Angela Relucio  as Mary Lane
 Sari Gagnon as Deborah Dallas
 Greg Nutcher as Officer Remillard
 Adrienne LaValley as Linnea Gold
 Jessica Alexandra Green as Paris Montag
 Dave Lounder  as Eagle Scout
 Hilma Falkowski as Rita
 Thomas Daniel as Bobby Ray
 Paul Braccioforte as Jack
 Ashley Bates  as Meghan Mazurski
 Christopher John Dionne as Rusty

References

External links 

2010 science fiction films
American science fiction television films
2010 films
2010s English-language films
2010s American films